Pine barrens, pine plains, sand plains, or pineland areas occur throughout the  U.S. from Florida to Maine (see Atlantic coastal pine barrens) as well as the Midwest, West, and Canada and parts of Eurasia. Perhaps the most well known pine-barrens area to North Americans is the New Jersey Pine Barrens. "Pine barrens" are generally pine forests in otherwise "barren" and agriculturally difficult areas.  Such pine forests often occur on dry, acidic, infertile soils, which also include grasses, forbs, and low shrubs. The most extensive pine barrens occur in large areas of sandy glacial deposits (including outwash plains), lakebeds, and outwash terraces along rivers.

Description

Botany
The most common trees are the jack pine, red pine, pitch pine, blackjack oak, and scrub oak; a scattering of larger oaks is not unusual. The understory includes grasses, sedges, and forbs, many of them common in dry prairies, and rare plants such as the sand-plain gerardia (Agalinis acuta). Plants of the heath family, such as blueberries and bearberry, and shrubs, such as prairie willow and hazel, are common. These species have adaptations that permit them to survive or regenerate well after fire.

Fauna
Pine barrens support a number of rare species, including Lepidoptera such as the Karner blue butterfly (Plebejus melissa samuelis) and the barrens buck moth (Hemileuca maia).

Fire ecology
The American Indians used fire to maintain such areas as rangeland.  Suppression of wildfires has allowed larger climax forest vegetation to take over in most one-time barrens. Barrens are dependent on fire to prevent invasion by less fire-tolerant species. In the absence of fire, barrens will proceed through successional stages from pine forest to a larger climax forest, such as oak-hickory forest. However, temperatures in a white pine forest on Long Island were high enough to destroy the pine cones which led to a slow recovery of the pine forest that varied depending on the availability of seedlings and the spatial variability in the conditions in the soil encountered by the seedlings.

See also
 Atlantic coastal pine barrens
 Eastern savannas of the United States
 List of pine barrens
 Long Island Central Pine Barrens
 New Jersey Pine Barrens
 Plymouth Pinelands
 Serpentine barrens

References

Sources
Wisconsin Department of Natural Resources
Northeastern pitch pine barrens
Pine Barrens in Rhode Island
Historic and prehistoric changes in the Rome, New York pine barrens. In Northeastern Naturalist, 1999, by Frank E Kurczewski

Ecoregions
Forest ecology
Forests of the United States